The NWA Shockwave Cruiser X Championship was a professional wrestling cruiserweight championship in NWA Shockwave (NWA-SW) and the National Wrestling Alliance (NWA). It was the original title of the CyberSpace Wrestling Federation promotion and was later recognized by the NWA as a regional title. It was introduced as the CSWF Heavyweight Championship on October 19, 2002. It was established as an NWA heavyweight championship in 2005 following the promotion's admission into the NWA. The promotion became NWA: Cyberspace, and later NWA Shockwave, with the title remaining active until being discontinued in December 2006.

The inaugural champion was Shawn Sheridan, who defeated Morbius and Brian Fury in a three way match on October 19, 2002 to become the first CSWF Heavyweight Champion. He was also its longest reigning champion at 329 days. There were 6 officially recognized champions, however none held the belt more than once. Several then current wrestlers from Total Non-Stop Action held the title during its 5-year history including Michael Shane, Sonjay Dutt and Elix Skipper.

Title history

Names

Reigns

List of combined reigns

Footnotes

See also
List of National Wrestling Alliance championships

References

External links
NWA Shockwave on Myspace
NWA Cyberspace on Myspace
CSWF.com
CSWOL.com

NWA Shockwave championships
Cruiserweight wrestling championships
X Division championships
National Wrestling Alliance championships